1988 was a year in the 20th century. 1988 may also refer to:

 1988 (Archie Roach album), a 2009 album by Archie Roach
 1988 (Blueprint album), a 2005 album by Blueprint
 1988 (Noah album), an album by Noah
 1988 (number)